The 1949 Delaware State Hornets football team represented Delaware State College—now known as Delaware State University—as a member of the Colored Intercollegiate Athletic Association (CIAA) in the 1949 college football season. The Hornets compiled a 3–5–1 record under coach Tom Conrad.

Schedule

References

Delaware State
Delaware State Hornets football seasons
Delaware State Hornets football